Christopher Paul (born November 19, 1998) is an American football offensive guard for the Washington Commanders of the National Football League (NFL). He played college football at Tulsa and was drafted by the Commanders in the seventh round of the 2022 NFL Draft. Paul is also an R&B artist known as The Seventh.

Early life
Paul was ranked as a twostar recruit by 247Sports.com coming out of high school. He enrolled at Tulsa University in 2017 and played for the Tulsa Golden Hurricane football team, graduating with a bachelor's degree in computer information systems in May 2021. Paul played in the 2022 Senior Bowl for the American team.

Professional career
Paul was selected by the Washington Commanders in the seventh round (230th overall) of the 2022 NFL Draft and signed his four-year rookie contract on May 6, 2022. He would see his first career start in the final game of his rookie season.

Music
Paul is also an independent R&B artist known as The Seventh. He has released music since 2020 and published a music video for his second single, "Mother Nature", in April 2022.

References

External links
 
 
 Washington Commanders bio
 Tulsa Golden Hurricane bio

Living people
Tulsa Golden Hurricane football players
Players of American football from Houston
American football offensive guards
Washington Commanders players
1998 births
American sportspeople of Nigerian descent
American football offensive tackles
African-American male singer-songwriters
Singer-songwriters from Texas
Musicians from Houston
African-American players of American football
American rhythm and blues singers
American rhythm and blues musicians